Pontotoc is a city in and the county seat of Pontotoc County, Mississippi, located to the west of the much larger city of Tupelo. The population was 5,625 at the 2010 census. Pontotoc is a Chickasaw word that means, “Land of the Hanging Grapes.”

History
Pontotoc is a Chickasaw word meaning "Land of Hanging Grapes". The Chickasaw nation occupied this area long before Europeans colonized the Southeast, the last in a succession of indigenous peoples who had this territory for thousands of years. In the early 1830s they were forced to Indian Territory west of the Mississippi River through the federal program of Indian removal.

In the late 19th century, the outlaws Jesse and Frank James and their gang came into this area. They once hid at an old house that had been used as a Union Army hospital during the Battle of Harrisburg or Battle of Tupelo in the Civil War. The house was located at a crossroad in east Pontotoc County, near the Lee County line.

The Town Square Museum is located in the historic US post office near the county courthouse. This space is used to house and display Pontotoc memorabilia. A full-service post office continues to operate in the building, which was built in 1937 during the Great Depression. It was one of numerous projects of the Works Progress Administration (WPA) under President Franklin D. Roosevelt. Investment in this program created work opportunities in construction of needed public buildings and infrastructure across the country, employing thousands of workers.

A mural in the post office lobby, titled The Wedding of Ortez and SaOwana - Christmas 1540 (1939), was commissioned as public art. It depicts a legendary feast given by Hernando de Soto to celebrate what was said to be the first recorded Christian marriage on the North American continent. The account appears to be local myth. 

The groom was said to be Juan Ortez (his name was spelled Ortiz in Spanish), an interpreter for the expedition. He was a Spanish national who had been captured in Florida years before and held by Chief Uceta. He was finally released as a slave and lived for years with the Mocoso people. His bride was said to be Princess Saowana, daughter of Chief Uceta. But Uceta's daughter was documented as Uleleh and she married a cacique, another Chickasaw chief.  The wedding is said to have taken place in Pontotoc County during a visit by de Soto's party, but there is little documentation of such an event. 

The mural was painted in 1939 by artist Joseph Pollet, who had immigrated to the US as a child with his family from Germany. He was commissioned under the arts program that was also part of the federal WPA program. Many artists and writers were employed by such projects, in addition to the workers who built federal buildings. Many murals and other art were created for post offices and other public buildings.

The city holds an annual festival in the Town Square during the last week of the month of September, called the Bodock Festival. It celebrates the Maclura pomifera (Osage orange) (also known as bois d'arc, or bowdock) tree located next to the historic mansion, Lochinvar; both survived a massive tornado in 2001.

Geography

Demographics

2020 census

As of the 2020 United States Census, there were 5,640 people, 1,906 households, and 1,342 families residing in the city.

2000 census
As of the census of 2010, 5,625 people, 2,325 households, and 2,129 families resided in the city. The population density was 555.9 people per square mile (214.6/km). The 2,250 housing units averaged 238.1/sq mi (91.9/km). The racial makeup of the city was 70.08% White, 20.42% African American, 0.35% Native American, 0.24% Asian, 0.03% Pacific Islander, 7.39% from other races, and 1.45% from two or more races. Hispanics of any race were 2.76% of the population.

Of the 2,325 households, 32.2% had children under the age of 18 living with them, 49.1% were married couples living together, 16.0% had a female householder with no husband present, and 31.9% were not families. About 29.2% of all households were made up of individuals, and 15.5% had someone living alone who was 65 years of age or older. The average household size was 2.41, and the average family size was 2.97.

In the city, the population was distributed as 25.7% under the age of 18, 8.6% from 18 to 24, 26.3% from 25 to 44, 21.5% from 45 to 64, and 18.0% who were 65 years of age or older. The median age was 37 years. For every 100 females, there were 84.8 males. For every 100 females age 18 and over, there were 77.6 males.

The median income for a household in the city was $28,491, and for a family was $39,306. Males had a median income of $31,403 versus $23,491 for females. The per capita income for the city was $17,324. About 12.0% of families and 17.6% of the population were below the poverty line, including 18.5% of those under age 18 and 23.0% of those age 65 or over.

Education
The almost all of the city of Pontotoc is served by the Pontotoc City School District  while a small portion of the city limits is in the Pontotoc County School District.

North Pontotoc High School and South Pontotoc High School are two of the top academic schools in the state of Mississippi. North received the Blue Ribbon Award and South received Level 5, the highest rating for a school in Mississippi. The city's band was the Grand Champion in the state in 2017.

Notable people
 Terry "Harmonica" Bean, bluesman; lifelong resident of Pontotoc
 Delaney Bramlett, singer, songwriter and musician; born in Pontotoc
 Thad Cochran, former U.S. Senator from Mississippi
 Alfred Oscar Coffin (born 1861), first African-American man to earn a Ph.D. in biological sciences; professor of Romance languages at Langston University; author, teacher, agent, and traveler; born in Pontotoc
 Borden Deal, novelist and short-story writer; from Pontotoc
 Ruby Elzy, pioneer black opera singer; played the soprano role of Serena in George Gershwin's Porgy and Bess; Broadway star; prominent radio, concert and film personality; buried in Pontotoc's City Cemetery
 Lee Gates (1937–2020), blues guitarist, singer, and songwriter; born in Pontotoc   
 Cyrus Harris (1817–1888, Chickasaw), politician, born on a farm outside the town, lived here until 1827, and returned 1830-37; he was among the Chickasaw removed to Indian Territory; he served five terms as Governor of the Chickasaw Nation.
 Kent Hull, former NFL Buffalo Bills center; from Pontotoc
 Cowan F. "Bubba" Hyde (born 1908), Negro league baseball player who played for the Birmingham Black Barons; born in Pontotoc
 Cordell Jackson, guitarist; born in Pontotoc; she is thought to be the first woman to produce, engineer, arrange, and promote music on her own rock and roll music label
 Max Palmer, professional wrestler; from Pontotoc
 Romie J. Palmer, Illinois jurist and legislator; born in Pontotoc
 Steve Pegues, former Major League Baseball player; from Pontotoc
 Wesley Walls, former National Football League tight end
 Jim Weatherly, singer, songwriter and musician, writer of song "Midnight Train to Georgia"; star Ole Miss quarterback; from Pontotoc
 Elizabeth H. West (born 1873), librarian and archivist; born in Pontotoc
 Roger Wicker, U.S. Senator from Mississippi

See also
 Tupelo National Battlefield

References

External links
 Old Pontotoc Post Office

Cities in Mississippi
Cities in Pontotoc County, Mississippi
County seats in Mississippi
Cities in Tupelo micropolitan area
Mississippi placenames of Native American origin